Herpetogramma pacificalis is a moth in the family Crambidae. It was described by George Hampson in 1912. It is found in Japan, where it has been recorded from the Bonin Islands and Ogasawara Islands.

References

Moths described in 1912
Herpetogramma
Moths of Japan